On Thursday, March 27, 1890, a major tornado outbreak struck the Middle Mississippi Valley. To this day, this outbreak is still one of the most deadly tornado events in United States history.  At least 24 significant tornadoes, several of which were generated by cyclic supercells, were recorded to have spawned from this system, and at least 146 people were killed by tornadoes that day, including a devastating F4 tornado that struck Downtown Louisville, Kentucky, killing at least 76 people and injuring at least 200 others.

Background and impact
At 8:00 a.m. EST (13:00 UTC) on March 27, a vigorous low-pressure center of at most  was in progress over central Kansas. Ahead of the low, an unstable air mass advected northward from the Gulf of Mexico, while a warm front positioned itself across Kentucky, southern Illinois, and south-central Missouri. By 8:00 p.m. A cold front encountering the warm, moist air mass over the Mississippi River Valley produced favorable wind shear for the development and growth of tornado-producing supercells over the warm sector. As a result, numerous long-lived tornado families occurred in a triangular region from St. Louis, Missouri, eastward to Louisville and southward to Huntsville, Alabama. In addition to 24 F2+ tornadoes, many other weaker tornadoes likely occurred but went unrecorded.

Confirmed tornadoes

March 27 event

Metropolis, Illinois/Sheridan–Blackford–Dickson–Delaware, Kentucky

This long-tracked, violent tornado family formed from the same supercell as the Bird's Point F3. One or more members of the family may have been the same as the Bird's Point tornado and touched down in Missouri, west of the Mississippi River, before entering Kentucky. After passing through McCracken County, the tornado traversed the Ohio River as a waterspout to strike the opposite shore at Metropolis, Illinois. In Metropolis the tornado destroyed 100 buildings, killed one person, and caused $150,000 in losses. The tornado reportedly carried water "as high as the rooftops" as it passed over the Ohio River. Unconfirmed rumors suggested that two Gypsies were killed in a nearby settlement and that a Gypsy woman was found  distant. Three confirmed deaths occurred on farms and in homes from just northeast of Metropolis to near Bay City. Another death occurred on the eastern bank of the Ohio River, in Kentucky. The tornado reportedly was "greenish" in appearance as it entered Livingston County, killing at least three and possibly as many as 11 people. In Crittenden County the tornado caused six deaths, five of which occurred in a home at Sheridan. Between Blackford and Dixon the tornado destroyed several dozen farms and miles of timberland; widespread F4 damage occurred in this area. Eight or more fatalities were reported in Webster County. A train derailed as it struck downed trees near Sebree, causing three indirect fatalities. Five people in one family were killed near Delaware. The tornado finally dissipated as a downburst in West Louisville, causing F2 damage, one fatality, and $50,000 in losses there.

Louisville, Kentucky

This devastating tornado may have first touched down in Harrison County, Indiana, but records with which to verify the precise location are sparse. The tornado is estimated to have developed just west of Shively shortly before 8:00 p.m. CST (01:00 UTC). In Louisville observers witnessed a thunderstorm to their southwest, noting that the cloud was of "extreme blackness" and lit by lightning. In Louisville the tornado generated its first significant damage in the California neighborhood, then part of Parkland, near the intersection of 28th and Dumesnil Streets. In this area the tornado caused its only instance of F4 damage, leveling a couple of homes. The most extensive damage occurred in a swath from the intersection of 34th Street and the Algonquin Parkway to the western half of the central business district, including Crescent Hill. Numerous unreinforced buildings, often multi-story, collapsed, including the Falls City Hall, where 44 or more fatalities occurred—one of the highest death tolls due to a single building collapse from a tornado in U.S. history. Some sources placed the toll at 55 in the Falls City Hall. Throughout the path, wreckage caught fire, burning several people to death. Century-old oaks and a water tower were downed as well. At one location the tornado wrenched and snapped iron railings. Across Louisville, the tornado destroyed at least 766 buildings (US$2½ million worth of property—a little over $1 billion in current dollars), including 532 residences, 32 manufacturers, 10 tobacco warehouses, three schools, a pair of public halls, seven rail depots, and five churches. After impacting Louisville, the tornado ended as a downburst in Jeffersonville, Indiana, opposite Louisville beside the Ohio River. In Jeffersonville widespread F2 damage, 20 minor injuries, and $500,000 in losses occurred as 18 or more structures were destroyed or damaged, principally within a few blocks of the riverfront. In all, the tornado killed an estimated 76 to 120 people and was one of the top 25 deadliest tornadoes in U.S. history until May 22, 2011. It was relegated to 26th when the May 22, 2011, tornado in Joplin, Missouri, killed 158.

Aftermath and recovery
Following the tornado at Louisville, then-Red Cross president Clara Barton arrived to assist the recovery. Electric trolleys were used to compensate for a shortage of hearses. The City of Louisville, while declining outside aid, also established 60-man work crews to sift through wreckage for survivors. Three days after the disaster—on March 30, Palm Sunday—as many as 45 separate funeral services were conducted in Louisville.

See also

List of North American tornadoes and tornado outbreaks
List of tornadoes striking downtown areas

Notes

References

Sources

External links
  — Historical tornado damage images and narrative from the University of Louisville Photographic Archives
 "The Great Cyclone of 1890: Tragedy Struck Louisville" — Article by Civil War historian/author Bryan S. Bush
 "Louisville, KY Tornado, Mar 1890" at GenDisasters.com

F4 tornadoes by date
Middle Mississippi Valley,1890-03-27
Tornadoes of 1890
Tornadoes in Missouri
Tornadoes in Illinois
Tornadoes in Kentucky
Tornadoes in Indiana
Tornadoes in Tennessee
History of Louisville, Kentucky
1890 natural disasters in the United States
March 1890 events